Love Is All I Need the second solo album of Yasmien Kurdi after her successful debut album, In the Name of Love. This 13-track album was produced and released by GMA Records in May 2007

Track list
 "Kisapmata" - 4:41
 "Give Me a Sign" - 2:52
 "Love Is All I Need" - 3:47
 "Even If" - 4:15
 "Take It or Leave It" - 3:49
 "Wishing Well" - 3:15
 "One Day" - 3:36
 "Hayaan Mo Na" - 3:19
 "Goodbye" - 4:00
 "Candlelight Romance" - 2:51
 "Take It or Leave It" (I Know Mix) - 3:49
 "Love Is All I Need" (Acoustic) - 3:40

References

2007 albums
GMA Music albums
Yasmien Kurdi albums